"200" is the fourteenth episode of the ninth season of the American police procedural crime drama television series Criminal Minds, and is the 200th episode overall, which aired on CBS on February 5, 2014. The episode was written by Rick Dunkle and directed by Larry Teng.

At the time of its initial release, the episode was watched by 12.92 million viewers and received mixed reviews but television critics praised A.J. Cook's performance.

Plot
After being abducted at the end of the previous episode, JJ (A. J. Cook) wakes restrained. She recognizes her captor, who drugs her.  
 
In a flashback to the U.S. Operations Camp in Afghanistan in 2010, JJ meets with Section Chief Erin Strauss (Jayne Atkinson). JJ has been assigned to a task force that is looking for Osama bin Laden, and will interrogate female suspects without the brutality used on male suspects. JJ meets Mateo Cruz (Esai Morales); Michael Hastings (Tahmoh Penikett); and Tivon Askari (Faran Tahir), her interpreter.
 
In the present day, the Behavioral Analysis Unit (BAU) learns of her disappearance and that she previously worked with their new Section Chief, Cruz, who is also missing. While looking through JJ’s old office, Rossi (Joe Mantegna) and Blake (Jeanne Tripplehorn) find documents about JJ’s 2010 mission, code-named "Integrity". Hotch (Thomas Gibson) goes to the Department of State to see Under Secretary of State for Arms Control and International Security Affairs Rosemary Jackson (Debrah Farentino), the creator of JJ’s taskforce. Under Secretary Jackson reveals Tivon Askari as the perpetrator, but, to avoid government scandal, bans the BAU from the investigation. Despite the ban, Hotch calls in reinforcements: Emily Prentiss (Paget Brewster), former BAU agent, now head of Interpol. 
 
The BAU classifies Askari as a serial killer and identifies his pattern. Askari tortures JJ and Cruz with water boarding, electrocution, and, for JJ, attempted rape, in order to get security codes to “Integrity”. JJ realizes that Askari is working with someone else, and, although the team initially suspects Cruz, Hastings is the real mole. His death via a roadside bomb in Afghanistan, which caused JJ to miscarry, was faked. 
 
While the team looks for JJ and Cruz, "Blackbird", JJ, appears on Garcia (Kirsten Vangsness)’s computer screen. She and Kevin (Nicholas Brendon) are apprehended for their hacking, but are able to relay JJ's location. Prentiss and Hotch find JJ just in time to prevent Askari from killing her. JJ and Prentiss fight Hastings, which culminates in his death by falling off the roof. Later, the team and Prentiss celebrate at a bar and say farewell to Prentiss before she heads back to London.

Production
On September 30, 2013, it was announced that former cast member Paget Brewster would return for the 200th episode and reprise her role as Emily Prentiss. On January 21, 2014, it was announced that Battlestar Galactica star Tahmoh Penikett had been cast in a key role as Michael Hastings.

Speaking about the 200th episode, A.J. Cook revealed that the episode will delve in to JJ's time away from the BAU during Season 6
"We're going to use the serendipitous gift of Season 6 to explain with flashbacks what happened when she was working for the Pentagon and why she came back as a much tougher character. I've never had a chance to flex my acting muscles like this on the show!".

Cook also revealed that she performed most of her own stunts during the episode - some of which Cook says she actually experienced so the show would look authentic. One of the stunts was being waterboarded.
  
This is the first time since the pilot episode that the opening credits were not shown as more time was needed for the episode footage, so the credits were cut, and the stars names were listed during the first scene following the teaser.

Reception

Ratings
The episode aired on CBS on February 5, 2014. Upon initial release, it was viewed by 12.92 million people and it also garnered a 2.8/7 Nielsen rating. "200" was also the week's third most watched drama and ranked tenth on the list of most watched television programmes overall. The episode also received 3.48 million more viewers in Live+7 ratings, bringing the viewer total to 16.39 million.

Critical response
"200" was met with mixed reviews. The episode has received an average score of 7.1 out of 10 in IMDb.

Gel Galang from the International Business Times gave the episode a positive review, calling it "an episode to remember" and said that it "does live up to its name and hype." TV Fanatic gave the episode 4.8/5 stars, saying that "Expectations for this installment were high. And I can say for sure that it met them with flying colors" but criticized the show for condensing the story into one episode, "it seems this story could well have been stretched over a few more episodes." Patty Gopez from TV Over Mind gave the episode a mixed review, saying that while the episode was emotional, it all "seemed fairly predictable."

References

2014 American television episodes
Criminal Minds